Stumpp is a surname. Notable people with the surname include: 

 Christina Stumpp (born 1987), German politician
Emil Stumpp (1886–1941), German painter, teacher, and artist
 Margaret Stumpp (born 1952), American businessperson
 Margit Stumpp (born 1963), German politician
 Peter Stumpp (1535–1589), German serial killer and farmer